Mars Canada Ltd is the Canadian division of Mars, Incorporated, a privately held multi-national company and a world leader in food, pet care products, and confectionery products.

Company history 
The Canadian division began its operation in the late 1940s as a branch of Uncle Ben's Inc. In 1967, the first Canadian office was opened in Montreal, moving to Toronto in 1972. In 1974, the branch was replaced by a Canadian limited company and named Effem Foods Ltd., which was named after the original founder Frank, his wife Ethel, and their son Forrest E. Mars.  In 1998, the company was renamed Effem Inc. The current name began use in 2007. In that same year, Effem was selected as one of Canada's Top 100 Employers, as published in Maclean's magazine.

Office locations 
Mars Canada's National Office is located in Bolton, Ontario, 20 minutes north of Pearson International Airport.

Also located in Bolton is the petfood manufacturing facility and the food manufacturing facility.

The confectionery facility is located in Newmarket, Ontario, 40 minutes north-east of the National Office.

Products 
The Mars portfolio has five of the world's leading confectionery brands, including the Mars Bar, Snickers Bar, Skittles and Twix Cookie Bars, and the world's single largest candy brand, M&M's Chocolate Candies.

Canadian brands:

Food
Ben's Original

Confectionery products
M&M's
Mars Bar
Snickers
Twix
3 Musketeers
Bounty
Dove Chocolate
Skittles
Starburst
Maltesers
Combos

Pet food
Pedigree Petfoods  (#1 brand in Canada)
Whiskas''' (#1 brand in Canada)CesarShebaTemptations''

External links 
 World Head Office Official site
 Mars Canada
 Company profile from Yahoo!

Notes and references 

Food and drink companies established in 1940
Canadian chocolate companies
Canada
Companies based in Caledon, Ontario
Food and drink companies of Canada
Privately held companies of Canada
1940 establishments in Ontario
Canadian subsidiaries of foreign companies
Canadian companies established in 1940